The International Nine Metre Class is a construction class, meaning that the boats are not identical but are all designed to meet specific measurement formula, in this case International Rule. At their heyday, Metre Classes were the most important group of international yacht racing classes, and they are still actively raced around the world. "Nine" in the class name does not, somewhat confusingly, refer to the length of the boat, but the product of the formula; 9mR boats are, on average, 18 meters long.

History
The 9mR was used as an Olympic Class during the 1920 Olympics. No entries were made.
The International Rule was set up in 1907 to replace an earlier, simpler handicap system which was often local or at best, national, and often also fairly simple, producing extreme boats which were fast but lightly constructed and impractical. The rule changed several times in history, and only about 50 boats were ever built.

Rule development

1907 Rule
Used from 1907–1920

where
  = waterline length (LWL)
  = beam
  = chain girth
  = difference between girth and chain
  = sail area
  = freeboard

Olympic results

1920
No competitors entered the Olympics in the 9 Metre.

References

Keelboats
Olympic sailing classes
Development sailing classes